The 2011 Australian Formula Ford Championship was a CAMS sanctioned national motor racing title for drivers of Formula Ford racing cars. It was the 42nd national series for Formula Fords to be held in Australia and the 19th to carry the Australian Formula Ford Championship name. The championship was contested over an eight-round series which began on 17 March 2011 at the Adelaide Parklands Circuit and ended on 13 November at Symmons Plains Raceway. Australian Formula Ford Management Pty. Ltd. was appointed by CAMS as the Category Manager for the series, which was officially known as the "2011 Australian Formula Ford Championship for the Ford Fiesta Cup".

Sonic Motor Racing Services driver Cameron Waters dominated the championship with a winning margin of 74 points over second placed Jack Le Brocq. Waters recorded seven race wins to Le Brocq's four, whilst third placed Nick Foster won six races. Other race winners were Matthew Brabham, who only contested a partial season in 2011, Daniel Erickson, Tom Williamson in the factory-supported Spectrum, Trent Harrison and Liam Sager.

Teams and drivers

The following teams and drivers contested the 2011 Australian Formula Ford Championship. All teams and drivers were Australian-registered, excepting Nick Cassidy and Andre Heimgartner, who were New Zealander-registered.

Note: All cars were powered by 1600cc Ford Duratec engines, as mandated by the 2011 Australian Formula Ford Technical Regulations.

Calendar
All races were held in Australia.

Note: Round 1 was contested over two races and all other rounds were contested over three races.

Points
Championship points were awarded on a 20–16–14–12–10–8–6–4–2–1 basis to the top ten classified finishers in each race. An additional point was awarded to the driver gaining pole position for the first race at each round.

Results

 # Note: Rett Noonan was officially classified in the championship results, whereas drivers who did not score any championship points were not classified.

References

External links
 Official Australian Formula Ford website
 2011 Racing Results Archive at www.natsoft.com.au

Australian Formula Ford Championship seasons
Formula Ford Championship